Frostius – known as Frost's toads – is a small genus of true toads consisting of only two species endemic to Brazil. The genus was proposed by David C. Cannatella in 1986 based on an analysis of a species previously classified as Atelopus. Various morphological and life-history information first suggested that it is sister taxon to Atelopus or Atelopus + Osornophryne, but later molecular evidence suggests that it is sister taxon to Oreophrynella. It was named for Darrel Frost in recognition of his work on anuran systematics.

Species
There are only two species in this genus:

References

 
Amphibians of South America
Endemic fauna of Brazil
Amphibian genera
Taxa named by David C. Cannatella